The Ministry of the Environment  is a ministry of the Government of Haiti. This ministry is responsible for overseeing the environment and natural resources, along with performing an integral role in the Prime Minister's Cabinet.

Government ministries of Haiti
Environment of Haiti
Haiti